Operating since 1891 and a State Icon, The Festival of Music is a joint venture of the South Australian Public Primary Schools' (SAPPS) Music Society and the Department for Education.

This school-based music education program culminates in performances at the Adelaide Festival Centre and in ten regional centres.

The Festival of Music provides opportunities for students to perform in:

choirs,
orchestras,
troupes,
as Hosts/soloists,
as Guest Artists,
as choreography leaders.

References

Music festivals in Australia